Lissachatina reticulata is a species of air-breathing land snail, a terrestrial pulmonate gastropod mollusc in the family Achatinidae, the giant African snails.

Description
Adults are large (shell roughly 15cm long by 7cm wide, body up to 20cm) with a distinct reticulated (ridged) shell that is the species' namesake. Shell colouring varies with brown, orange, and yellow streaks and tends to occur in roughly vertical banding. There is also dark speckling present, more visible in the lighter streaks. The flesh can be a soft brown with a dark head, or a slightly translucent milky yellow in albino individuals.

Diet
They eat leaves, fruits and vegetables, faeces and occasionally dead animals or insects.

Reproduction
This species is hermaphroditic, and individuals possess both male and female sex organs but cannot self fertilise. They are not known to hybridize with other snail species. It produces eggs with a diameter of 9mm in clutches of up to around 350 eggs when in ideal conditions, and can store sperm from partners for many years, producing multiple batches of viable eggs from one mating. They can live up to 10 years, but on average survive 6-7 years.

Social behaviour
They are not observed to be obligatorily social animals but will gather to rest and mate, and are not actively aggressive to other individuals. Adults may pose a danger to hatchlings by walking over them or knocking them off surfaces in captivity, and smaller snails may rasp on larger ones shells for calcium, weakening and discolouring the others' shell over time.

History
It was originally described as Achatina reticulata, reclassified as Achatina (lissachatina) reticulata, and recently placed in the genus Lissachatina.

Habitat
The native distribution of Lissachatina reticulata includes the coastal region of Zanzibar. The species is also present in other countries such as Nigeria, as a moderate invasive species brought to the area by human interaction.

The recommended captivity temperature is 23-27 Celsius, and they are active in 70-80% humidity.

References

External links
 Fontanilla I.K.C. (2010). Achatina (Lissachatina) fulica Bowdich: its molecular phylogeny, genetic variation in global populations, and its possible role in the spread of the rat lungworm Angiostrongylus cantonensis (Chen). PhD thesis, University of Nottingham. 634 pp
 giantafricanlandsnails.com care guide
 Shell Morphology, Radula and Genital Structures of New Invasive Giant African Land Snail Species, Achatina fulica Bowdich, 1822, Achatina albopicta E.A. Smith (1878) and Achatina reticulata Pfeiffer, 1845 (Gastropoda:Achatinidae) in Southwest Nigeria
 Kevdavies Exotic Pets' Achatina reticulata care guide & history

Achatinidae
Gastropods described in 1845
Taxa named by Ludwig Karl Georg Pfeiffer